J. Crichton and Company was a ship building company based at Saltney, Flintshire, North Wales.  The company was set up by James Crichton in 1913.  In 1918, the company acquired another shipyard, at Connah's Quay.

The company built stern-wheelers, coasters, barges, ferries, lightships, launches, tugs, and yachts.

The Saltney Yard closed in 1935.

See also
 HMAS Kara Kara

References
 

1935 disestablishments in Wales
British boat builders
Manufacturing companies established in 1913
Defunct shipbuilding companies of Wales
Yacht building companies
1913 establishments in Wales
Manufacturing companies disestablished in 1935
British companies disestablished in 1935
British companies established in 1913